Julian A. Brodsky (born July 16, 1933) is an American businessman, the co-founder of Comcast Corporation and served as its chief financial officer and vice chairman. He also served as co-founder and chair of Comcast Interactive Capital, Comcast's venture capital unit now called Comcast Ventures.

Early life and education
Brodsky was raised in a Jewish family in Philadelphia, Pennsylvania, and graduated from the Wharton School of the University of Pennsylvania. He served two years in the United States Army before training as an accountant.

Career
In 1963, Brodsky joined one of his clients, Ralph J. Roberts, and Roberts' adviser, Daniel Aaron, to purchase a 1,200-subscriber cable TV operator in Tupelo, Mississippi called American Cable Systems. They incorporated in 1969 as Comcast Corporation, a name Roberts invented by combining the words communications and broadcasting. The partners became a powerful leadership team with a style described as a threesome driving a car with Brodsky stepping on the gas by raising the necessary capital for growth, Aaron with his foot on the brakes to ensure effective operations, and Roberts with his hands on the steering wheel as CEO.

References

External links
Cable Center Oral History
Cable Center Honorary Board Member bio
2003 Cable Hall of Fame Induction

1933 births
Living people
American corporate directors
Jewish American military personnel
American technology company founders
Comcast people
American cable television company founders
Wharton School of the University of Pennsylvania alumni
United States Army soldiers
Businesspeople from Philadelphia
American chief financial officers